The 2018 FIS Cross-Country Australia/New Zealand Cup was a season of the Australia/New Zealand Cup, a Continental Cup season in cross-country skiing for men and women. The season began on 21 July 2018 in Perisher Valley, New South Wales, Australia and concluded on 6 September 2018 in Snow Farm, New Zealand.

Calendar

Men

Women

Overall standings

Men's overall standings

Women's overall standings

References

External links
2018 Overall Standings Men
2018 Overall Standings Women

Australia/New Zealand Cup
FIS Cross-Country Australia/New Zealand Cup seasons
2018 in cross-country skiing